Pons is a surname of Catalan origin. It is also given name. Within a person’s personal name, it is sometimes used as a first name or middle name.

Pons is also sometimes used mononymously (e.g., by someone who is known simply as Pons, as Jorge Mario Bergoglio (Pope Francis) is sometimes known as "Francis").

Notable people with this name include:

Surname

A–J
Abel Molinero Pons (born 1989), Spanish footballer
Alain Pons (born 1995), Gibraltarian footballer
Antoinette de Pons-Ribérac (1560–1632), French courtier
Antonio Pons (1897–1980), Ecuadorian politician
Axel Pons (born 1991), Spanish motorcycle racer and model; son of Sito Pons, brother of Edgar Pons
Beatrice Pons (1906–1991), American actor
Bernadeth Pons (born 1996), Filipino volleyball player
Bernard Pons (born 1926), French politician and physician
Bonne de Pons d'Heudicourt (1644–1709), French courtier
Cipriano Pons (1890–unknown), Argentine fencer and Olympics competitor
Edgar Pons (born 1995), Spanish motorcycle racer; son of Sito Pons, brother of Axel Pons
Eduard Pons Prades (1920–2007), Spanish anarchist, writer, historian, and politician
Eolo Pons (1914–2009), Argentine painter
Esteban González Pons (born 1964), Spanish politician
Facundo Pons (born 1995), Argentine footballer
Fabrizia Pons (born 1955), Italian race car driver
Félix Pons (1942–2010), Spanish politician; brother of Josep Maria Pons Irazazábal
Francisco Pons y Boigues (1861–1899), Spanish Arabist and historian
Francisco Vallejo Pons (born 1982), Spanish chess grandmaster
Frank Moya Pons (born ?), Dominican historian, writer, and educator
Frédéric Pons (born 1954), French army officer and journalist
Gastón Pons Muzzo (1922–2004), Peruvian chemist
Geoffroy III de Pons (died 1191), French noble
Ingrid Pons (born 1975), Spanish basketball player and Olympics competitor
Jaufre de Pons (13th-cent.), French troubadour
Jaurés Lamarque Pons (1917–1982), Uruguayan composer and pianist
Jean François Pons (1688–1752), French Jesuit priest, philologist, and Indologist
Jean-Louis Pons (1761–1831), French astronomer
Jim Pons (born 1943), American bass guitarist, singer, and film and video director
Joan Lluís Pons (born 1996), Spanish swimmer and Olympics competitor
Josep Pons (disambiguation), several people
Josette Pons (born 1947), French politician
Juan Pons (born 1946), Spanish operatic baritone singer
Julia Pons (born 1994), Spanish field hockey player

L–Z
Laia Pons (born 1993), Spanish synchronized swimmer and Olympic medalist
Lele Pons (born 1996), Venezuelan and American internet personality, actor, and singer
Léo Pons (born 1996), French filmmaker
Lily Pons (1898–1976), French-born American operatic soprano singer and actor
Louis Pons (born 1927), French collage artist
Louis Marc Pons, marquis de Pons (1789), French diplomat
Luciano Pons (born 1990), Argentine footballer
Marc Capdevila Pons (born 1974), Spanish swimmer and Olympics competitor
Marcello Rodriguez Pons (born 1965), Argentine architect, designer, and sailor
María Pons (disambiguation), several people
Mario Pons (born 1967), Ecuadorian cyclist and Olympics competitor
Marina Pons (born 1977), Spanish sport shooter and Olympics competitor
Mercè Pons (born 1966), Spanish actor
Norma Pons (1942–2014), Argentine actor and showgirl
Olivier Pons (born 1958), French rower and Olympics competitor
Pascal Pons (born 1968), French percussionist
Patrick Pons (1952–1980), French motorcycle racer
Paul Pons (1864–1915), French wrestler
Paul-Marie Pons (1904–1996), French naval engineer and civil servant
Pere Pons (born 1993), Spanish footballer
Rainaut de Pons (12th or 13th-cent.), French troubadour of indiscernible identity
Ramón Pons (1940–2014), Spanish actor
Raymond Pons ( Pons I; died after 944), French noble; Count of Toulouse
Renaud de Pons (seneschal of Gascony) (1189–1228), French noble and Crusader; uncle of Renaud II de Pons
Renaud II de Pons (1170–1252), French noble and Crusader; nephew of Renaud de Pons (seneschal of Gascony)
Richard Fitz Pons (1080–1129), Anglo-Norman noble and warrior
Salvador Salort-Pons (born 1970), Spanish-born American art historian and museum director
Sito Pons (born 1959), Spanish motorcycle racer and team owner; father of Axel and Edgar Pons
Stanley Pons (born 1943), American-born French electrochemist and cold fusion experimenter
Teodoro Pons (1896–1968), Spanish runner and Olympics competitor
Ventura Pons (born 1945), Spanish film director
Víctor Pons (1935–1999), Puerto Rican American justice, attorney, and political campaign manager
Vimala Pons (born 1986), Indian-born French actor and juggler
Xavier Pons (born 1980), Spanish race car and motorcycle driver
Yves Pons (born 1999), Haitian-born French basketball player

In fiction
Solar Pons, a detective created by writer August Derleth in 1928

Given name

First or mononymous name
Pons Augustin Alletz (1703–1785), French agronomist
Pons, Count of Tripoli (1098–1137), French noble-born Count of Tripoli
Pons d'Arsac (1162–1181), French Catholic archbishop
Pons de Cabrera (1105–1162), Catalan nobleman, courtier and military leader
Pons de Capduelh (12th–13th-cent.), French troubadour
Pons de Cimiez (died 257), Gallo-Roman Christian martyr and saint
Pons de la Guardia (1154–1188), Catalan knight, troubadour, and poet
Pons de Minerva (1114/15–1175) Occitan noble, courtier, governor, and general
Pons de Monlaur (early 13th-cent.), French lord and troubadour
Pons d'Ortaffa (1170–1246), Catalan noble and troubadour
Pons I ( Raymond Pons; died after 944), French noble; Count of Toulouse
Pons II (991–1060), French noble; Count of Toulouse
Pons Maar (born 1951), American actor, puppeteer, artist, and filmmaker
Pons of Balazun (died 1099), Occitan noble, Crusader, and historian
Pons of Melgueil (1075–1126), French noble and abbot
Pons of the Cross (13th-cent.), European knight, and Master of the Templars
Pons Santolh (13th-cent.), French troubadour

Middle name
Georges-Antoine-Pons Rayet (1839–1906), French astronomer
Henri-Pons de Thiard de Bissy (1657–1737), French Catholic bishop and cardinal
Jean-Pons-Guillaume Viennet (1777–1868), French politician, playwright, and poet

See also
Pontius (disambiguation), a related name

Catalan-language surnames